Abu Ali Hasan ibn Ustadh-Hurmuz, commonly known after his father as Ibn Ustadh-Hurmuz (died 1011) was a Daylamite military officer of the Buyids, and an important figure in the Buyid state during the late 10th century.

Biography

Origins 
He was the son of Ustadh-Hurmuz, a prominent Buyid chamberlain (hajib), who, after the death of the Buyid king Adud al-Dawla, began serving the latter's eldest son Sharaf al-Dawla, who was the ruler of Fars, and fought for complete control of the Buyid Empire against his younger brother Samsam al-Dawla, who was the ruler of Iraq. During this period, Ustadh-Hurmuz was appointed by Sharaf al-Dawla as the governor of Oman. However, wishing to change his allegiance to Sharaf al-Dawla's brother, he was forced to retire in 984.

Service under the Buyids of Fars 
During this period, Ibn Ustadh-Hurmuz was about 23 years old and was already in the service of Samsam al-Dawla; but in 987, Samsam al-Dawla was defeated and captured by Sharaf al-Dawla, who shortly annexed Iraq. He, however, died himself one year later, and was succeeded by his younger brother Baha' al-Dawla in Iraq, while Samsam al-Dawla managed to escape from captivity and fled to Fars, where he managed to conquer the entire region, and was joined by Ibn Ustadh-Hurmuz including other of his former officers such as Fuladh ibn Manadhar. In 995, Ibn Ustadh-Hurmuz became the leader of his Daylamite kinsmen in the Buyid army, thus giving him a powerful position in the Buyid Empire. Two years later, he captured Ahvaz, but in the following year, Samsam al-Dawla was killed during a revolt by the sons of the deceased former Buyid ruler Izz al-Dawla.

Service under the Buyids of Iraq 
Ibn Ustadh-Hurmuz quickly used the opportunity to transfer his allegiance to Baha' al-Dawla, who became the new ruler of Fars. In 1001, Ibn Ustadh-Hurmuz was appointed as the governor of Ahvaz, and one year later, became the governor of Iraq, where he made order by solving disputes between different religious sects, and by defeating bandits who had caused chaos in the region.

He also managed to defeat the former governor of Iraq, Abu Ja'far al-Hajjaj, who was supported by Kurds and Shayban Arabs. He also defended Iraq against incursions from Batihah and the Hasanwayhid ruler Badr ibn Hasanwayh. Furthermore, Ibn Ustadh-Hurmuz managed to suppress the rebellion of the Uqaylid ruler Qirwash, who had briefly taken control of a few Buyid cities and had changed his allegiance to the Fatimid Caliphate. Ibn Ustadh-Hurmuz later died in 1010/1, and was succeeded by the Buyid vizier Fakhr al-Mulk as the governor of Iraq. Ibn Ustadh-Hurmuz's father, however, outlived the latter, and lived until 1015.

References

Sources 
 
 
 

Daylamites
Buyid generals
1011 deaths
10th-century Iranian people
11th-century Iranian people
Buyid governors